Maria Pia of the Two Sicilies (2 August 1849 – 29 September 1882) was a Princess of the Two Sicilies and titular Duchess consort of Parma as the wife of Robert I, Duke of Parma. Maria Pia was the daughter of King Ferdinand II of the Two Sicilies and his wife, Maria Theresa of Austria. Maria Pia was forced into exile along with the rest of her family after the unification of Italy in 1861.

Marriage and issue

Maria Pia married Robert I, the exiled Duke of Parma and Piacenza and son of Charles III, Duke of Parma and his wife Princess Louise Marie Thérèse of France, on 5 April 1869 in Rome. Maria Pia and Robert had twelve children of whom six were mentally disabled:

Princess Marie Louise of Parma (17 January 1870 – 31 January 1899) she married Ferdinand I of Bulgaria on 20 April 1893. They had four children.
Prince Ferdinando of Parma (5 March 1871 – 14 April 1871)
Princess Luisa Maria of Parma (24 March 1872 – 22 June 1943) she was mentally disabled.
Henry, Duke of Parma (13 June 1873 – 16 November 1939) he was mentally disabled
Princess Maria Immacolata of Parma (21 July 1874 – 16 May 1914) she was mentally disabled.
Joseph, Duke of Parma (30 June 1875 – 7 January 1950) he was also mentally disabled
Princess Maria Teresa of Parma (15 October 1876 – 25 January 1959) she was mentally disabled.
Princess Maria Pia of  Parma (9 October 1877 – 29 January 1915) she was mentally disabled.
Princess Beatrice of Parma (9 January 1879 – 11 March 1946) she married Count Pietro Lucchesi-Palli (grandson of from second marriage of Princess Caroline of Naples and Sicily) on 12 August 1906. They had three sons:
Count Antonio Lucchesi-Palli (1 June 1907 – 4 January 1911) 
Count Roberto Lucchesi-Palli (7 May 1908 – 9 June 1983) he married Stefania Ruffo di Calabria on 7 June 1941. They have four sons.
Count Adinolfo Lucchesi-Palli (18 June 1911— 26 February 1986) he married Sarolta Teleki Gräfin von Szek on 2 June 1946. They have six children.
Elias, Duke of Parma (23 July 1880 – 27 June 1959) he married Archduchess Maria Anna of Austria on 25 May 1903. They had eight children.
Princess Maria Anastasia of Parma (25 August 1881 — 7 September 1881) Died in infancy.
Prince Augusto of Parma (22 September  1882 – 22 September 1882) stillborn child

Later life

Maria Pia died in childbirth and was buried at Villa Borbone near Viareggio. After her death, Robert I remarried in 1884 to Maria Antonia of Portugal, daughter of the deposed Miguel I of Portugal and Adelaide of Löwenstein-Wertheim-Rosenberg; she bore him another twelve children.

Ancestry

References

External links

1849 births
1882 deaths
People from Gaeta
Deaths in childbirth
Princesses of Bourbon-Two Sicilies
Princesses of Bourbon-Parma
Duchesses of Parma
Italian Roman Catholics
Daughters of kings